Yoann Bonato (born 13 May 1983) is a French rally driver. He currently competes in the French Rally Championship and the WRC-2, the premier support category of the World Rally Championship, with customer Citroën team CHL Sport Auto. He also works as a development driver for Citroën's in-house customer support team PH Sport. Bonato won the French Rally Championship outright in 2017, 2018 and 2020, earning the title of "Champion of France."

After winning the French Rally Championship in 2017, PH Sport hired Bonato to be part of a team of drivers that would help Citroën develop a new R5 variant of their WRC car, the Citroën C3. Bonato gave the car its first full rally-spec test at the closing event of the French Championship Rallye du Var, as a Course Car. He, along with factory Citroën driver Stéphane Lefebvre, would give the C3 its competitive debut at the Tour de Corse the following year.

His co-driver since the beginning of his career is Benjamin Boulloud.

Rally results

Complete WRC results

* Season still in progress.

WRC-2 Results

WRC-3 results

* Season still in progress.

JWRC Results

References

External links
ewrc-results.com profile
Yoann Bonato's Facebook
Yoann Bonato Twitter
Yoann Bonato's website

Living people
World Rally Championship drivers
French racing drivers
French rally drivers
1983 births
People from Saint-Martin-d'Hères
Sportspeople from Isère
European Rally Championship drivers